WBNW-FM (105.7 MHz) branded as "Now 105-7", is a class B top 40 radio station in Binghamton, New York. The station is owned by iHeartMedia.  It is the primary entry point of the Emergency Alert System in central New York state.

History
The station, under the WMRV call sign, was named for the late entertainer and game show creator Merv Griffin, who owned the FM station, as well as its sister station, WENE. When Griffin and his wife, Julann, divorced in 1973, she retained ownership of the stations as part of the settlement. WMRV-FM became known as "Star 105.7" in the 1990s.  The station was a CHR/Top 40 station from its beginning until 2004. It was rated #1 for several years during the late 1990s.

WMRV-FM flipped to a hot adult contemporary format in 2004; it returned to Top 40 as Contemporary Hit Radio in April 2012. On March 11, 2013, the station rebranded as "Now 105.7" and changed its call sign to WBNW-FM. Now 105.7 FM is known as The #1 Hit Music Station.

External links

BNW-FM
IHeartMedia radio stations
Contemporary hit radio stations in the United States